This is a list of notable alumni of the University of Sussex.

Politicians

Scientists

Academics

Writers and broadcasters

Musicians and entertainers

 Louis Russell, Tall Man

Diplomats

Sports 
 Rosalie Birch, England Test cricketer, part of Ashes winning team 2005 
 Brendan Foster, former distance runner, founder of the Great North Run, and currently a BBC athletics commentator
Jayanthi Kuru-Utumpala, mountaineer and first Sri Lankan and fourth women in the world to reach the peak of Mount Everest
 Ralf Rangnick, Former Interim Manager of Manchester United F.C., Head Coach of the Austria national football team
 Virginia Wade, Wimbledon Ladies' Singles Champion, 1977

Business

Others
{{columns-list|colwidth=20em|
 Michael Attenborough, director
 Linda Bellos, adviser
 Michael Fuller, Chief Constable of Kent Police
 Bruno Heller, screenwriter and actor
 Naomie Kremer, artist
 Claire Oboussier, artist
 David Pecaut, American-born Canadian civic activist and consultant
 Florence Ralston, one of the youngest ever Bargain Hunt contestants (2017)

References 

University of Sussex
Sussex